Lumiere TV (LTV) was a former pay television service based in Cyprus and broadcast in more than 67 European and African countries. It broadcast movies, series, documentaries and social TV shows. It was owned by LTV Group Ltd.

Availability
Repeaters had been set up across 67 countries that enabled more than 80% of the population to receive these services. Lumiere TV was originally available on the Nova platform but following a financial dispute, it moved over to rival Athina Sat in July 2006. As of March 3, 2008, LTV was once again available through Nova, following a new agreement that was signed between the two companies.

The channel is no longer available through Athina Sat, which ceased operations in March 2008. It was also available through IPTV providers CytaVision and PrimeTel until its final closure and liquidation in August 2014.

Channels and content
Lumiere TV operated eight multiplex channels:

Former Programming
Lumiere TV featured hit movies from Greece and abroad, including Hollywood blockbusters. It also aired hit TV series from the US and it broadcast over 15 premieres each month with new release films being added continuously.

Series
10 Things I Hate About You
2 Broke Girls
30 Rock
90210
According to Jim
Alcatraz
Alias
America's Next Top Model
Army Wives
The Big Bang Theory
Big Love
Boardwalk Empire
Bones
Bored to Death
The Borgias
Brothers & Sisters
Californication
Castle
Chuck
The Closer
Cold Case
The Comeback
Cougar Town
Criminal Justice
Criminal Minds
CSI: Miami
CSI: NY
The Cult
Curb Your Enthusiasm
Desperate Housewives
E! True Hollywood Story
Eastwick
Entourage
ER
Flight of the Conchords
The Forgotten
Friends
Fringe
From the Earth to the Moon
Gossip Girl
Grey's Anatomy
Half & Half
Harry's Law
Hawaii Five-0
Heroes
House
How to Make It in America
Human Target
Hung
In Treatment
It's Always Sunny in Philadelphia
Joey
The King of Queens
Mad Men
Melissa & Joey
The Mentalist
Miami Medical
The Middle
NCIS: Los Angeles
Necessary Roughness
The Office
One Tree Hill
The Oprah Winfrey Show
The Protector
Shameless
The Simpsons
Sons of Anarchy
The Sopranos
Southland
Supernatural
Survivor
Tell Me You Love Me
Terminator: The Sarah Connor Chronicles
Trust Me
Two and a Half Men
Ugly Betty
Underbelly
Underbelly NZ: Land of the Long Green Cloud
United States of Tara
V
The Vampire Diaries
The Wire
Without a Trace

Children's
The Adventures of Jimmy Neutron, Boy Genius
All Grown Up!
The Angry Beavers
As Told by Ginger
Avatar: The Last Airbender
Back at the Barnyard
CatDog
ChalkZone
Hey Arnold!
iCarly
Kappa Mikey
Rocket Power
Rugrats
SpongeBob SquarePants
The Wild Thornberrys

References

External links
Youtube Playlist of LTV promos

Defunct television channels in Cyprus
Greek-language television stations
Television channels and stations established in 1993
Television channels and stations disestablished in 2014